Shenington with Alkerton is a civil parish in Oxfordshire, England. It comprises the village of Shenington, which was an exclave of Gloucestershire until the Counties (Detached Parts) Act 1844 transferred it to Oxfordshire and the village of Alkerton, which was always part of Oxfordshire.  It covers 9.60 km2 and as at the 2011 census had a population of 425 people.

Sources

References

Civil parishes in Oxfordshire